Rubroboletus rhodosanguineus is a fungus of the genus Rubroboletus native to North America. It was described scientifically by mycologist Ernst Both in 1998. It was transferred from Boletus to the new genus Rubroboletus in 2014, along with several other allied reddish colored, blue-staining bolete species.

See also
List of North American boletes

References

External links

rhodosanguineus
Fungi described in 1998
Fungi of North America